Balqazan (also Romanized as Balqazān; also known as Barqazan and Barqazan) is a village in Chahriq Rural District, Kuhsar District, Salmas County, West Azerbaijan Province, Iran. At the 2006 census, its population was 204, in 42 families.

References 

Populated places in Salmas County